David Roy Cowling (born 27 November 1958) is an English former professional footballer who played in the Football League as a left winger for Huddersfield Town, where he played 340 league games during the 1970s and 1980s. He also played for Scunthorpe United and Reading.

Playing career
Born in Doncaster, Cowling started his career at Mansfield Town, but never appeared for their first team before moving to Huddersfield Town in 1977. He is particularly remembered for two goals he scored during the 1982–83 season: the winner against Leeds United in the Football League Cup, and the only goal of the game against Newport County which secured Huddersfield's promotion to the Second Division.

During his time at Huddersfield, Cowling was linked with moves to Manchester United, Leeds United and Nottingham Forest on more than one occasion.

He later signed for Reading in 1988, before returning to Glanford Park.

Managerial career
After his playing days, Cowling joined the coaching staff at Scunthorpe United. He then moved to Doncaster Rovers, where he coached the youth teams before taking over as first team manager in October 1997, a post which he resigned after ten days because of interference from the chairman, Ken Richardson, regarding team selection. He remained on the staff under Danny Bergara's management, but was laid off a few months later.

After a short stint at Goole AFC, and turning down management positions abroad in the United States and Sweden, Cowling went on to become director of youth at Bury, and youth development officer for Darlington F.C. a position he held whilst also working as director of football development at Darlington College. Here he established a soccer school in partnership with his son Lee, also a former professional footballer. 

As well as his position with Darlington, Cowling also spent time working for Southampton FC as a club scout. 

Highly regarded by many Premier League clubs for his experience in youth football, he also works for The FA Premier League as a Staff Coach at The Premier League Exit trials.

As of 2011, Cowling set up and runs a footballing academy based at the Keepmoat Stadium in Doncaster, England with his son Lee. The academy is the only one of its kind in the United Kingdom, providing formal education and footballing education to teenagers and young adults. In 2016, Esprit expanded to the United States, with Cowling's  son Lee hosting soccer camps during the summer.

He is currently a Northern scout for Liverpool and Fulham FC.

Cowling also holds a UEFA Pro qualified coaching badge.

References

External links
 
 

1958 births
Footballers from Doncaster
Living people
English footballers
Association football wingers
Mansfield Town F.C. players
Huddersfield Town A.F.C. players
Scunthorpe United F.C. players
Reading F.C. players
English Football League players
English football managers
Doncaster Rovers F.C. managers